Apu  is a Bangladesh Awami League politician and the former Member of Parliament from a reserved seat.

Career
Apu Ukil was elected to parliament from reserved seat as a Bangladesh Awami League candidate in 2014. She is the founding General Secretary of Jubo Mohila Awami League who served from March 2004 to December 2022. Her husband, Ashim Kumar Ukil, is also a Bangladesh Awami League politician.

References

Awami League politicians
Living people
10th Jatiya Sangsad members
Women members of the Jatiya Sangsad
21st-century Bangladeshi women politicians
21st-century Bangladeshi politicians
Year of birth missing (living people)